Pamaypay, also known as paypay, payupas, buri fan, or anahaw fan, is a type of traditional hand-held fan from the Philippines. It is typically made of woven buri palm or anahaw palm leaves. It is usually heart-shaped, and woven in a technique known as sawali (twilled). The edges are braided and merges into a looped handle. It is also typically made into wall decorations and other handicrafts. 

The term is also sometimes used for the abaniko, a folding hand fan used by the upper classes in the Spanish colonial period of the Philippines.

See also
Abaniko
Apir
Hand fan
Buntal hat
Baro't saya

References

Philippine clothing
Ventilation fans
Philippine handicrafts